Voivode (also spelled voievod, voevod, voivoda, vojvoda or wojewoda) is a title denoting a military leader or warlord in Central, Southeastern and Eastern Europe in use since the Early Middle Ages. It primarily referred to the medieval rulers of the Romanian-inhabited states and of governors and military commanders of Hungarian, Balkan or some Slavic-speaking populations.

In the Polish-Lithuanian Commonwealth, voivode was interchangeably used with palatine. In the Tsardom of Russia, a voivode was a military governor. Among the Danube principalities, voivode was considered a princely title.

Etymology

The term voivode comes from two roots.  is related to warring, while  means 'leading' in Old Slavic, together meaning 'war leader' or 'warlord'. The term has also spread to non-Slavic languages, like Romanian, Hungarian and Albanian, in areas with Slavic influence.

History

During the Byzantine Empire it referred to military commanders mainly of Slavic-speaking populations, especially in the Balkans, the Bulgarian Empire being the first permanently established Slavic state in the region. The title  originally occurs in the work of the 10th-century Byzantine emperor Constantine VII in his De Administrando Imperio, in reference to Hungarian military leaders.

The title was used in medieval: Bohemia, Bosnia, Bulgaria, Croatia, Greece, Hungary, Macedonia, Moldavia, Poland, Rügen, Russian Empire, Ukraine, Serbia, Transylvania and Wallachia.

During the Ottoman administration of Greece, the Ottoman Voivode of Athens resided in the ancient Gymnasium of Hadrian.

The Serbian Autonomous Province of Vojvodina descends from the Serbian Vojvodina, with Stevan Šupljikac as Vojvoda or Duke, that became later Voivodeship of Serbia and Banat of Temeschwar.

Military rank

In the Kingdom of Serbia and its later iteration, the Kingdom of Yugoslavia, the highest military rank was Vojvoda. After the Second World War, the newly formed Yugoslav People's Army stopped using the royal ranking system, making the name obsolete.

Title of nobility and provincial governorship

The transition of the voivode from military leader to a high ranking civic role in territorial administration (Local government) occurred in most Slavic-speaking countries and in the Balkans during the Late Middle Ages. They included Bulgaria, Bohemia, Moldavia and Poland. Moreover, in the Czech lands, but also in the Balkans, it was an aristocratic title corresponding to dux, Duke or Prince. Many noble families of the Illyricum still use this title despite the disputes about the very existence of nobility in the Balkans.

Polish–Lithuanian Commonwealth 
In 16th-century Poland and Lithuania, the wojewoda was a civic role of senatorial rank and neither heritable nor a title of nobility. His powers and duties depended on his location. The least onerous role was in Ruthenia while the most powerful wojewoda was in Royal Prussia. The role began in the crown lands as that of an administrative overseer, but his powers were largely ceremonial. Over time he became a representative in the local and national assemblies, the Sejm. His military functions were entirely reduced to supervising a mass mobilization and in practice he ended up as little more than overseer of weights and measures.

Appointments to the role were usually made until 1775 by the king. The exceptions were the voivodes of Polock and Vitebsk who were elected by a local poll of male electors for confirmation by the monarch. In 1791, it was decided to adopt the procedure throughout the country but the 18th-century Partitions of Poland put a stop to it. Polish voivodes were subject to the Law of Incompatibility (1569) which prevented them from simultaneously holding ministerial or other civic offices in their area.

The role was revived during the Second Polish Republic after Poland regained its independence in 1918.

Modern Poland 

Voivodes continue to have a role in local government in Poland today, as authorities of voivodeships and overseers of self-governing local councils, answerable not to the local electorate but as representatives/emissaries of the central government's Council of Ministers. They are appointed by the Chairman of the Council of Ministers and among their main tasks are budgetary control and supervision of the administrative code.

Ottoman Empire 

In some provinces and vassal states of the Ottoman Empire, the title of voivode (or voyvoda) was employed by senior administrators and local rulers. This was especially common in the Danubian Principalities, which protected the northern borders of the empire and were ruled by the Greek Phanariotes. The title "Voyvoda" turned into another position at the turn of the 17th century. The governors of provinces and sanjaks would appoint someone from their own households or someone from the local elites to collect the revenues.

Ottoman Greece 
The chief Ottoman administrator of Athens was also called the voivode. One such holder of this title, Hadji Ali Haseki, was voivode on five separate occasions before his final banishment and execution in 1795 after angering both the Greek and Turkish residents of Athens and making powerful enemies at the Porte.

References

Bibliography
 

 Béla Köpeczi, ed. History of Transylvania, vol. I., 411, 457. (archived URL)
 voivode. (n.d.). Webster's Revised Unabridged Dictionary. Retrieved November 15, 2007, from Dictionary.com
F.Adanir, "Woywoda", The Encyclopaedia of Islam (XI: 215 a)
M. Kokolakis, “Mia autokratoria se krisi, Kratiki organosi-Palaioi Thesmoi-nees prosarmoges” [An Empire in Crisis: State Organization – Old Institutions – New Adjustments], in Istoria tou neou ellinismou, Vol. 1, publ. Ellinika Grammata, Athens 2003, p. 49.

External links
 

Noble titles
Slavic titles
Serbian noble titles
Titles of national or ethnic leadership
Court titles in the Middle Ages
Military ranks
Bosnian noble titles
Romanian noble titles
Ottoman titles